Harry Stewart (25 April 1925 - April 1996) was a professional footballer, who played for Huddersfield Town in the Football League as a left full-back. He was born in Wigan in 1925.

Career
Prior to becoming a professional footballer, Stewart served in the army, who he represented at football. He played for Thorne Colliery switching to Goole Town before moving back to Thorne Colliery, where he was signed by Huddersfield Town. He was part of the infamous 'Great Escape' Huddersfield team that narrowly avoided relegation from the First Division and despite being a regular he left the club in 1951 to return to non-league football at Frickley Colliery.

After football
Following his unexpected departure from Huddersfield Town, Stewart returned to the Thorne area of Doncaster where he later worked in the colliery and also worked at Bullcroft Colliery, then Richard Dunston's Shipyard in Thorne before retiring. He continued to be involved with football in the Thorne area, as a player and later as a referee.

References

1925 births
1996 deaths
English footballers
Footballers from Wigan
Association football defenders
English Football League players
Huddersfield Town A.F.C. players
Frickley Athletic F.C. players
Goole Town F.C. players
Thorne Colliery F.C. players